The Kern Plateau salamander (Batrachoseps robustus) is a species of salamander in the family Plethodontidae, endemic to California, in Tulare and Inyo, and Kern Counties in the western United States.

Distribution

Its natural habitat is freshwater springs in the temperate coniferous forests and in higher Mojave Desert-Sierra forest ecotones.

Conservation
The Kern Plateau salamander is threatened by habitat loss, and it is an IUCN Red List Near threatened species.

References

External links

IUCN: all species searchpage

Batrachoseps
Salamander
Salamander
Fauna of the Sierra Nevada (United States)
Fauna of the Mojave Desert
Kings Canyon National Park
Sequoia National Park
Inyo National Forest
Natural history of Fresno County, California
Natural history of Inyo County, California
Natural history of Kern County, California
Taxonomy articles created by Polbot
Amphibians described in 2002